Robert "Rob"/"Bob" Prosser (born 14 November 1943) is a Welsh former rugby union, and professional rugby league footballer who played in the 1960s and 1970s.

Playing career

International honours
Bob Prosser won 4 caps for Wales (RL) in 1968–1970 while at Salford.

Championship final appearances
Bob Prosser was an unused interchange/substitute, i.e. number 14, in St. Helens' 35-12 victory over Halifax in the Championship Final during the 1965–66 season at Station Road, Swinton on Saturday 28 May 1966, in front of a crowd of 30,165.

BBC2 Floodlit Trophy Final appearances
Bob Prosser played  in St. Helens' 0-4 defeat by Castleford in the 1965 BBC2 Floodlit Trophy Final during the 1965–66 season at Knowsley Road, St. Helens on Tuesday 14 December 1965.

References

External links
Profile at saints.org.uk
Newport RFC : 1963/4 Season Summary 
Newport RFC : 1964/5 Season Summary 
 History of Newport RFC :: 1874–2010
(archived by web.archive.org) Profile at blackandambers.co.uk

1943 births
Living people
Coventry R.F.C. players
Crawshays RFC players
Footballers who switched code
Newport RFC players
Rugby league halfbacks
Rugby league five-eighths
Rugby league players from Rhondda Cynon Taf
Rugby union players from Tylorstown
Rugby union scrum-halves
Salford Red Devils players
St Helens R.F.C. players
Wales national rugby league team players
Welsh rugby league players
Welsh rugby union players